The 2019 Indiana Hoosiers men's soccer team represented Indiana University Bloomington in men's college soccer during the 2019 NCAA Division I men's soccer season and 2019 Big Ten Conference men's soccer season. It was the 47th season the university fielded a men's varsity soccer program, and the 29th season the program played in the Big Ten Conference.

Indiana entered the 2019 season as the defending Big Ten Conference regular season and tournament champions.

Background 

The 2018 Indiana Hoosiers men's soccer team represented Indiana University Bloomington in men's college soccer during the 2018 NCAA Division I men's soccer season and 2018 Big Ten Conference men's soccer season. It was the 46th season the university fielded a men's varsity soccer program, and the 28th season the program played in the Big Ten Conference.

During the regular season Indiana completed the league double by winning both the Big Ten regular season, and the 2018 Big Ten Conference Men's Soccer Tournament. The Hoosiers were seeded second overall in the 2018 NCAA Division I Men's Soccer Tournament, where they reached the College Cup before losing to eventual national champions, and fellow Big Ten side, Maryland.

Indiana defender, Andrew Gutman, was named the winner of the Hermann Trophy, the top individual award a men's college soccer player can earn.

Player movement

Departures

Players arriving

Transfers

Preseason

Preseason Big Ten poll
Indiana was predicted to finish 1st in the Big Ten Conference.

Roster

Schedule 

|-
!colspan=6 style=""| Preseason

|-
!colspan=6 style=""| Regular season
|-

|-
!colspan=6 style=""| Big Ten Tournament
|-

|-
!colspan=6 style=""| NCAA Tournament
|-

Rankings

Statistics

Appearances and goals

Discipline

Summary

Awards

2020 MLS SuperDraft

Homegrown players

See also 
 2019 Indiana Hoosiers women's soccer team
 2019 NCAA Division I men's soccer season
 2019 Big Ten Conference men's soccer season

References

External links  
 IU Men's Soccer
 2019 IU Men's Soccer Schedule

2019
Indiana Hoosiers
Indiana Hoosiers
Indiana Hoosiers men's soccer
Indiana Hoosiers
Big Ten Conference men's soccer champion seasons